Chance in a Million is a British sitcom broadcast between 1984 and 1986, produced by Thames Television for Channel 4.

The series was co-written by Andrew Norriss and Richard Fegen and starred Simon Callow and Brenda Blethyn.

The producer and director of the series was Michael Mills.

Plot
The premise of the show is that the main character, Tom Chance, is frequently the victim of unlikely circumstances, although he cares little about this and is, in fact, largely oblivious to much of what happens around him.

He meets his long-suffering girlfriend, Alison Little, by chance.  This happens when Tom Chance goes to the same hotel on a blind date to meet a girl (who is also called Alison), that Alison Little has arranged to meet her cousin Tom (for the first time since they were young children).

Tom is shy towards Alison.  However, Alison has fallen in love with Tom at first sight and she is keen for their friendship to develop into something more intimate.

Tom has a tendency to get into trouble as a result of unlikely coincidences.  This leads to Tom being arrested for crimes he did not commit – which happens so often that police Sergeant Gough eventually gives orders for Tom not to be arrested, no matter how suspicious the circumstances.  Tom accepts the unintentional incidents which continuously occur in his life with great stoicism.

Tom has an amusing ability to drink an entire pint of lager in one gulp whilst in the middle of speaking a sentence. (According to Callow in a DVD commentary, a trick glass containing a fraction of a pint was actually used.)

Tom's style of speaking is a key component of his comic nature. He speaks only in short staccato sentences similar to a telegram: "Can’t talk Alison. Car being towed. Problem with lawn furniture."

He also has a fascination with Surrey and England cricketer Alec Bedser, and a cricket bat, which has been autographed by the cricketer, is one of Tom's most treasured possessions. (Or at least was, before it was chewed up by next door's alsatian.) And in the penultimate episode, Alison presents her husband-to-be with a book containing a signed dedication by Bedser, to Tom's great delight.

Cast
 Simon Callow as Tom Chance
 Brenda Blethyn as Alison Little
 Ronnie Stevens (series 1), Hugh Walters (series 2 and 3) as Mr. Little
 Deddie Davies as Mrs. Little
 Bill Pertwee as Sergeant Gough
 Angus MacKay as Terrence Wingent
Geraldine Gardner aka Trudi Van Doorn as Barbara Wingent – (series 2 & 3)
Peter Corey as Cousin Thomas
 Rosemary Smith as "Janet" – (series 3)

Episodes

Series overview

Series 1 (1984)

Series 2 (1986)

Series 3 (1986)

Home releases

Notes
Speaking about the series following its release on DVD Simon Callow said: "I loved doing it and it's one of the most popular things I ever did. The central character, Tom Chance, was a guy who was plagued by coincidence that was the basic formula of the series. The charming thing about him was that he seemed to belong to another world completely. He spoke in the most extraordinary way, which I think was derived from Mr. Jingle in The Pickwick Papers – he never used the personal pronouns ... He'd say, "... went to bank ... had problem ... sat down ... couldn't get out ... killed a woman ... very sad...". Brenda Blethyn, she's absolutely superb in it. Brenda and I and the writers are desperately keen to do a series, 25 years later on ... same couple ... I think it would be wonderful."

Brenda Blethyn, in her 2006 autobiography Mixed Fancies, speaks of the series at length with clear affection and happy memories of the project.

References

 The Penguin TV Companion (2nd Edition) – Jeff Evans, Penguin Books Ltd., London, 2003

External links
 
 
 Chance in a Million  – BBC Comedy Guide
 Chance in a Million — Summary and Cast – British TV Comedy
 Chance in a Million — Episode List – British TV Comedy

1980s British sitcoms
1984 British television series debuts
1986 British television series endings
Channel 4 sitcoms
Television series by Fremantle (company)
Television shows produced by Thames Television
English-language television shows
Television shows shot at Teddington Studios